is a Japan-exclusive video game for the Nintendo Family Computer. The game was one of six that required Bandai's  System in order to operate.

Gameplay
Players build their own combat robots to use in a fighting tournament. These robots are built in factories that assign the robot a name in addition to installing its head, body, shoulder, and feet. The player has a pre-game lobby to get ready for the robot combat action. All matches have rounds of 60 seconds (unlike the 99-second round of most modern fighting video games). Both robots have a separate gauge for energy and damage. Standard punches and kicks can be thrown in addition to special moves (which look like ammunition).

Reception
On release, Famicom Tsūshin scored the game a 16 out of 40.

References

1993 video games
Bandai games
Japan-exclusive video games
Nintendo Entertainment System games
Nintendo Entertainment System-only games
Video games about robots
Tose (company) games
Video games developed in Japan